Karpathos Island National Airport  is an airport in the island of Karpathos, Greece. The airport first operated in 1970 and it had very limited facilities (a small building of only 500 m2). Today its buildings cover an area of 12,500 m2. The current airport facilities were constructed between 2005 and 2009. The inauguration of the new airport terminal took place on 25 July 2009.

A bus route directly connects Karpathos Airport and the capital of the island Pigadia. Taxis are also available at the designated waiting area.

Airlines and destinations
The following airlines operate regular scheduled and charter flights at Karpathos Airport:

Statistics

See also
List of airports in Greece

References

External links
 Karpathos Island National Airport
 Karpathos Airport on Hellenic Civil Aviation Authority website

Airports in Greece
Dodecanese